Khatunbagh (also Romanized as Khātūnbāgh and Khātūn Bāgh) is a village in Akhtachi-ye Gharbi Rural District, in the Central District of Mahabad County, West Azerbaijan Province, Iran. At the 2006 census, its population was 552, in 103 families.

References 

Populated places in Mahabad County